EMBiology is a bibliographic database established in June 2005, and produced by Elsevier. EMBiology focuses on indexing the literature in the life sciences in general. Coverage includes science in the laboratory (fundamental research) and science in the field (applied research). It is designed to be smaller than EMBASE, with abstracting and indexing for  1,800 journals not covered by the larger database. However, there is some overlap. Hence, EMBiology is specifically designed for academic institutions that range from small to mid-size and all biotechnology  and pharmaceutical companies.

Global in scope, and with back file coverage to 1980, this database contains over four million bibliographic records, with an additional 250,000 records added annually. EMBiologyhas cover to cover indexing of 2,800 active titles; these are peer reviewed journals, trade publications, and journals that are only in electronic format. A life science thesaurus known as EMTREE (see section below), and an organism taxonomy vocabulary of 500,000 terms are also part of this database.

The organism vocabulary originates from the taxonomies described by the National Center for Biotechnology Information (NCBI) and the Integrated Taxonomic Information System (ITIS). Other Internet resource searching that is available are CAS Registry Numbers, Enzyme Commission Numbers, Cross Archive Searching (ARC), ChemFinder, Molecular Sequence Information, Resource Discovery Network (RDN), and Scrius.

Subject coverage encompasses molecular biology, biotechnology, genetics, biochemistry, microbiology, cell biology, developmental biology, agriculture, food science, plant sciences, zoology, environmental science, ecology, toxicology, laboratory science (fundamental research), and science in the field (applied sciences).

EMTREE
EMTREE is a life science thesaurus (database) published by Elsevier that is designed to support both EMBASE and EMBiology (see above).  This database contains descriptions of all biomedical terminology, indexing drug and disease with 56,000 search terms, and 230,000 synonyms.

References

External links
Field Guide for EMBiology. Ovid Technologies. September 20, 2005. (accessed: 2011-01-30).

Bibliographic databases and indexes
Biological databases
Databases in Europe
Publications established in 2005
Elsevier